Acacia wiseana is a shrub that grows in arid and semi-arid parts of northern Western Australia and the Northern Territory.

Description
The divaricate light green glabrous branchlets are short and straight with striate-ribbing. Like most Acacia species, it has phyllodes rather than true leaves. The sparse and inconspicuous, light green phyllodes shed frequently from the branchlets. the phyllodes are patent to deflexed with a linear shape that is pentagonal-compressed to flat. It produces yellow flowers from July to September.

Taxonomy
It was first published by Charles Gardner in 1942,  based on a specimen collected by him and possibly also Frank Wise (the publication lists Wise as a collector, but the herbarium specimens are only tagged with Gardner's name), near Wandagee on the Minilya River in Western Australia, on 31 August 1932. The specific epithet honours Wise.

Distribution
It is found throughout the Gascoyne and scattered though the Pilbara regions of Western Australia extending eastward into the Northern Territory where it grows in sandy loam soils.

See also
List of Acacia species

References

 

wiseana
Flora of the Northern Territory
Acacias of Western Australia
Fabales of Australia
Taxa named by Charles Gardner
Plants described in 1942